Hungary competed at the 2020 Summer Paralympics in Tokyo, Japan, between 24 August and 5 September 2021. This was Hungary's twelfth appearance at the Summer Paralympics.

Medalists

Competitors
The following is the list of number of competitors participating in the Games:

Archery

Tamás Gáspár qualified to compete.

Athletics

Hungary allocated five quotas in athletics.
Track events

Field events

Cycling

Zsombor Wermeser and Róbert Ocelka with pilot Gergely Nagy qualified to compete.

Paratriathlon

Petra Lévay qualified to compete.

Paracanoe

Tamás Juhász, Erik Kiss, Péter Pál Kiss, Erika Pulai, András Rozbora and Katalin Varga qualified to compete.

Powerlifting

Sedric Roussel qualified to compete.

Shooting

Hungary entered two athletes into the Paralympic competition. Krisztina Dávid will contest in her second Paralympics while Gyula Gurisatti will be at his debut Games.

Swimming

Seven Hungarian swimmers qualified to compete at the Summer Paralympics after participating at the 2019 World Para Swimming Championships where four medals were won and their MQS swimming times were achieved.
Men

Women

Table tennis

Hungary entered four athletes into the table tennis competition at the games. Alexa Szvitacs qualified from the 2019 ITTF European Para Championships which was held in Helsingborg, Sweden and other three athletes qualified via World Ranking allocation.

Men

Women

Wheelchair fencing

Gyöngyi Dani, Éva Hajmási, Zsuzsanna Krajnyák, Boglárka Mező, Richárd Osváth, István Tarjányi and Amarilla Veres were all qualified to compete.

See also
Hungary at the Paralympics
Hungary at the 2020 Summer Olympics

References

Nations at the 2020 Summer Paralympics
2020
2021 in Hungarian sport